Vasum aquitanicum is an extinct species of medium to large sea snail, a marine gastropod mollusk in the family Turbinellidae.

Description

Distribution
Fossils of this marine species have been found in Oligocene of the Adour region in France.

References

 M. Harzhauser. 2007. Oligocene and Aquitanian gastropod faunas from the Sultanate of Oman and their biogeographic implications for the western Indo-Pacific. Palaeontographica Abteilung A 280:75-121
 Lozouet, P. (2021). Turbinelloidea, Mitroidea, Olivoidea, Babyloniidae et Harpidae (Gastropoda, Neogastropoda) de l'Oligocène supérieur (Chattien) du bassin de l'Adour (Sud-Ouest de la France). Cossmanniana. 23: 3-69.

External links
 Peyrot A. (1925-1928). Conchologie néogénique de l'Aquitaine. Actes de la Société Linnéenne de Bordeaux. 77(2): 51-194

aquitanicum
Gastropods described in 1928